The Max Planck Institute for Cell Biology was located in Ladenburg, Germany. It was founded 1947 as Max Planck Institute for Oceanic biology in Wilhelmshaven, after renaming in 1968, it was moved to Ladenburg 1977 under the direction of Hans-Georg Schweiger. It was closed 1 July 2003. It was one of 80 institutes in the Max Planck Society (Max Planck Gesellschaft).

External links 
 Homepage of the Max Planck Institute for Cell Biology

 

Molecular biology institutes
Cell Biology (closed)
1947 establishments in Germany
2003 disestablishments in Germany